Brooks Health Centre is a community hospital is located in Brooks, Alberta, Canada.

Alberta Health Services is responsible for the operations of the hospital. It contains 40 acute care and 75 long-term care beds. It is staffed by 14 family physicians and two emergency physicians. There is currently a pilot underway to reduce ER wait times where patients are prompted in the waiting room to self identify whether they may be able to visit their family physician instead of the emergency department.

Services
Emergency
Diagnostic imaging (X-ray, CT, Ultrasound)
Endoscopy
General surgery
Inpatient medical care
Laboratory
Physical therapy
Respiratory therapy

Neurology
Currently, all patients with stroke are diverted to Calgary or Medicine Hat Regional Hospital. Telehealth services are being implemented to designate Brooks Health Centre as a stroke centre. Neurologists in Calgary will review CT results and interact with the patient remotely allowing stroke thrombolysis to take place in Brooks. It is forecast this will benefit 12-15 patients per year.

Obstetrics
Obstetrical care was suspended in 2009 due to lapses in C-Section support. However, since April 2010, deliveries have been provided.

EMS
Emergency medical services personnel are planned to be integrated with other hospital staff with an upcoming relocation of the ambulance service adjacent to the hospital in an effort to improve utilization of these personnel and lower costs.

Funding
Non-profit funding is provided by the Brooks and District Health Foundation.

References 

Brooks, Alberta
Hospitals in Alberta
Heliports in Canada
Certified airports in Alberta